Thanisandra was a village in the southern state of Karnataka, India. It was located in the Bangalore East taluk of Bangalore Urban district in Karnataka. Thanisandra area is slated for development with the expansion of the main road as an alternative road to Bangalore International Airport.

Thanisandra is now part of Bangalore Mahanagara Palike and as the development of Bangalore city towards the new airport continues, many professionals have started inhabiting the area, water supply as well as proper electrical facilities extend through the entire stretch on Thanisandra main road, though few of the bi-lanes are yet to receive water supply from the BWSSB. As of 2001 India census, Thanisandra had a population of 7557 with 3732 males and 3825 females.

References

Bangalore